Arthur Carr (26 July 1910 – 11 September 1986) was a British equestrian and Olympic medalist. He won a bronze medal in show jumping at the 1948 Summer Olympics in London.

References

1910 births
1986 deaths
British male equestrians
Olympic equestrians of Great Britain
Olympic bronze medallists for Great Britain
Equestrians at the 1948 Summer Olympics
Olympic medalists in equestrian
Medalists at the 1948 Summer Olympics